Theodore Francis Vactor (born May 27, 1944) is a former American football cornerback in the National Football League (NFL) for the Washington Redskins and Chicago Bears.  He played college football at the University of Nebraska. 

Vactor is credited with blocking the Miami Dolphins' Garo Yepremian's late field goal attempt in Super Bowl VII that led to the bizarre fumble-return touchdown by the Washington Redskins' Mike Bass. Vactor rushed from the left side and blocked the kick; the kick was not actually blocked by defensive lineman Bill Brundige.

Vactor also served as the head football coach at the University of the District of Columbia from 1977 to 1982 where he compiled an overall record of 24–31–1. He resigned his position as the Firebirds' head coach in 1983 to become an assistant coach with the Washington Federals of the United States Football League.

In 1999, Vactor was inducted to the Washington-Greene County Chapter of the Pennsylvania Hall of Fame and in 2000 he was inducted into the Nebraska Hall of Fame.

Head coaching record

References

1944 births
Living people
Sportspeople from Pennsylvania
American football cornerbacks
Players of American football from Pennsylvania
Washington Redskins players
Chicago Bears players
Nebraska Cornhuskers football players
UDC Firebirds football coaches
United States Football League coaches